Jin Pengxiang (Chinese: 晋鹏翔; Pinyin: Jìn Péngxiáng, born 25 January 1990 in Dalian) is a Chinese professional footballer who last played for Chinese Super League club Beijing Guoan.

Club career
Jin joined Zhejiang Greentown youth team system from Dalian Shide in 2006. He started his professional football career in 2007 when he was sent to China League Two side Hangzhou Sanchao (Zhejiang Greentown Youth). He was promoted to Hangzhou Greentown's first team squad by Wu Jingui in 2010. On 18 June 2011, Jin made his Super League debut in a 1–0 home victory against Shanghai Shenhua, coming on as a substitute for Wu Wei in the 62nd minute. He became a regular player in the rest of the season, playing 19 league matches for the club.

Jin was put into the transfer list in January 2012 after Takeshi Okada became the head coach of the club. On 5 February 2012, he transferred to Chinese Super League newcomer Dalian Aerbin on a five-year deal. He made his debut for Dalian Aerbin on 11 March 2013, in a 1–0 away defeat against Tianjin Teda. He quickly establish himself within the team and appeared 25 times in the 2012 league season.

On 2 February 2015, Jin transferred to fellow Chinese Super League side Beijing Guoan. On 4 July 2016, Jin was loaned to China League One side Tianjin Quanjian until 31 December 2016. On 10 July 2018, he returned to Dalian Yifang on a half-year loan deal. On 25 February 2019, Jin was loaned to Guangzhou R&F for the 2019 season.

On 8 June 2022, he scored the first goal in his career after making his professional debut over a decade ago, in a 3-2 win over Chengdu Rongcheng in the Chinese Super League. He left Guoan at the end of the 2022 Chinese Super League season when his contracted finished.

Career statistics 
Statistics accurate as of match played 26 February 2023.

Honours

Club
Tianjin Quanjian F.C.
China League One: 2016.

References

External links
 

1990 births
Living people
Chinese footballers
Association football defenders
Footballers from Dalian
Zhejiang Professional F.C. players
Dalian Professional F.C. players
Beijing Guoan F.C. players
Tianjin Tianhai F.C. players
Guangzhou City F.C. players
Chinese Super League players
China League One players
China League Two players